Claudin-5 is a protein that in humans is encoded by the CLDN5 gene. It belongs to the group of claudins.

Function 

This gene encodes a member of the claudin family. Claudins are integral membrane proteins and components of tight junction strands. Tight junction strands serve as a physical barrier to prevent solutes and water from passing freely through the paracellular space between epithelial or endothelial cell sheets. Mutations in this gene have been found in patients with velocardiofacial syndrome.

Interactions 

CLDN5 has been shown to interact with CLDN1 and CLDN3.

References

External links

Further reading